Jacob Noe (born July 29, 1980) is an American professional mixed martial artist who competes in Bellator's Light Heavyweight division. A professional competitor from 2000 until 2013, he also competed for Strikeforce.

Background
Noe was born in Memphis, Tennessee and raised in Munford. Noe grew up in a rough neighborhood and began training in Karate at the age of six, and then transitioned into Tae Kwon Do when he was 17. Noe attended Munford High School along with fellow Bellator Light Heavyweight and former UFC Light Heavyweight Champion Quinton "Rampage" Jackson, who Noe would befriend. Noe was a talented football player, going to the state finals with his high school team and personally held the state record for most tackles in a single game. However, during his senior year he injured his neck in a car accident which resulted in the end of his football career. Noe then joined a local Boxing team with "Rampage" Jackson which evolved into mixed martial arts training as Jackson would teach Noe Wrestling techniques and Noe would teach Jackson striking techniques.

Mixed martial arts career

Early career
Noe made his professional debut in 2000. He became more active in 2007 after a few fights to tune up his craft and didn't fight again until 2008. Noe compiled a professional record of 3-1 with one no contest before making the under card with Strikeforce.

Strikeforce
Noe faced Wes Little on November 19, 2010 at Strikeforce Challengers: Wilcox vs. Ribeiro. He won via unanimous decision.

Bellator
Noe made his Bellator debut on August 24, 2012 at Bellator 73 against Brian Albin. Noe won via corner stoppage at the end of the first round.

Noe faced Seth Petruzelli on November 19, 2010 at Bellator 85 in the quarterfinal match of the season eight light heavyweight tournament. He won via TKO in the first round.

In the semifinal, Noe faced former Sambo World Champion Mikhail Zayats on February 21, 2013 at Bellator 90. He lost the fight via submission in the first round.

Noe returned to the organization as a competitor in Bellator's Light Heavyweight Summer Series Tournament on Spike.  He faced Renato Sobral in the opening round of a 4-man tournament at Bellator 96 on June 19, 2013 and won the fight via TKO in the third round.

Noe faced former Strikeforce Light Heavyweight Champion Muhammed Lawal in the finals on July 31, 2013 at Bellator 97. Noe lost via TKO in the third round.

Titan FC
In September 2014, Noe signed with Titan FC. He was expected to make his promotional debut in early 2015.

Personal life
Noe is single and has 3 children.

Championships and accomplishments
Bellator Fighting Championships
Bellator 2013 Summer Series Light Heavyweight Tournament Runner-Up

Mixed martial arts record

|-
| Loss
| align=center| 12–3 (1)
| Muhammed Lawal
| TKO (punches)
| Bellator 97
| 
| align=center| 3
| align=center| 2:51
| Rio Rancho, New Mexico, United States
| Bellator 2013 Summer Series Light Heavyweight Tournament Final.
|-
| Win
| align=center| 12–2 (1)
| Renato Sobral
| TKO (referee stoppage)
| Bellator 96
| 
| align=center| 3
| align=center| 3:32
| Thackerville, Oklahoma, United States
| Bellator 2013 Summer Series Light Heavyweight Tournament Semifinal.
|-
| Loss
| align=center| 11–2 (1)
| Mikhail Zayats
| Submission (armbar)
| Bellator 90
| 
| align=center| 1
| align=center| 3:38
| West Valley City, Utah, United States
| Bellator Season Eight Light Heavyweight Tournament Semifinal.
|-
| Win
| align=center| 11–1 (1)
| Seth Petruzelli
| TKO (punches)
| Bellator 85
| 
| align=center| 1
| align=center| 2:51
| Irvine, California, United States
| Bellator Season Eight Light Heavyweight Tournament Quarterfinal.
|-
| Win
| align=center| 10–1 (1)
| Brian Albin
| TKO (doctor stoppage)
| Bellator 73
| 
| align=center| 1
| align=center| 5:00
| Tunica, Mississippi, United States
| 
|-
| Win
| align=center| 9–1 (1)
| Chris Hawk
| Submission (verbal)
| EF: Empire Fights 3
| 
| align=center| 1
| align=center| 4:08
| Memphis, Tennessee, United States
| 
|-
| Win
| align=center| 8–1 (1)
| Roman Pizzolato
| Submission (rear-naked choke)
| EF: Empire Fights 2
| 
| align=center| 1
| align=center| 2:35
| Memphis, Tennessee, United States
| 
|-
| Win
| align=center| 7–1 (1)
| Chris Bell
| TKO (injury)
| Imperial Fighting X Series: Undisputed 2
| 
| align=center| 1
| align=center| 3:00
| Memphis, Tennessee, United States
| 
|-
| Win
| align=center| 6–1 (1)
| Adrian Miles
| Submission (rear-naked choke)
| Prize Fight Promotions: Mid South MMA Championships 4
| 
| align=center| 3
| align=center| 2:33
| Southaven, Mississippi, United States
| 
|-
| Win
| align=center| 5–1 (1)
| Chris Hawk
| TKO (punches)
| Prize Fight Promotions: Mid South MMA Championships 3
| 
| align=center| 1
| align=center| 4:28
| Southaven, Mississippi, United States
| 
|-
| Win
| align=center| 4–1 (1)
| Wes Little
| Decision (unanimous)
| Strikeforce Challengers: Wilcox vs. Ribeiro
| 
| align=center| 3
| align=center| 5:00
| Jackson, Mississippi, United States
| 
|-
| Win
| align=center| 3–1 (1)
| Tel Faulkner
| Submission (arm-triangle choke)
| Empire FC: A Night of Reckoning 4
| 
| align=center| 1
| align=center| 1:58
| Tunica, Mississippi, United States
| 
|-
| Loss
| align=center| 2–1 (1)
| Goldman Butler
| TKO (punches)
| Cage Assault: On Edge
| 
| align=center| 2
| align=center| 2:43
| Memphis, Tennessee, United States
| 
|-
| NC
| align=center| 2–0 (1)
| Matt Thomas
| No contest (illegal knee)
| Cage Assault: Bragging Rights
| 
| align=center| 1
| align=center| N/A
| Memphis, Tennessee, United States
| 
|-
| Win
| align=center| 2–0
| Billy MacDonald
| TKO (punches)
| ECL: Brawl For A Cause
| 
| align=center| 1
| align=center| 1:08
| Bixby, Oklahoma, United States
| 
|-
| Win
| align=center| 1–0
| Grady Hurley
| TKO (submission to punches)
| CFA 2: Continental Freefighting Alliance 2
| 
| align=center| 2
| align=center| 0:50
| Corinth, Mississippi, United States
|

References

1980 births
Living people
American male mixed martial artists
Light heavyweight mixed martial artists
Mixed martial artists utilizing collegiate wrestling
Mixed martial artists utilizing karate
Mixed martial artists utilizing taekwondo
American male karateka
American male taekwondo practitioners